is a  mountain of Chushin Highland, located in Nagawa, Nagano Prefecture, Japan. This mountain is a part of the Yatsugatake-Chūshin Kōgen Quasi-National Park.

Leisure 
On Mount Ōsasa, there is Blanche Takayama Sky Resort.

Route 

There are several routes to the top of the mountain. The easiest route is to use sky lifts of Blanche Takayama Sky Resort from Takayama in winter. From April to November many climbers use a route from Himekidaira.

Access 
 Himekidaira-Chuo Bus Stop of JR Kanto Bus

Gallery

References
 Official Home Page of the Geographical Survey Institute in Japan
  ‘Yatsugatake, Tateshina, Utsukushigahara, Kirigamine 2008, Shobunsha

Osasa